The men's 4 × 100 metre medley relay competition at the 2010 Pan Pacific Swimming Championships took place on August 21 at the William Woollett Jr. Aquatics Center.  The last champion was the United States.

Records
Prior to this competition, the existing world and Pan Pacific records were as follows:

Results
All times are in minutes and seconds.

Heats
Heats weren't performed, as only seven teams had entered.

Final 
The final was held on August 21, at 20:27.

References

4 × 100 metre medley relay
2010 Pan Pacific Swimming Championships